Viktor Nikolayevich Goncharov (born 20 March 1976 in Moscow) is a former Russian football player.

References

1976 births
Living people
Footballers from Moscow
Russian footballers
Association football midfielders
Russian expatriate footballers
Expatriate footballers in Belarus
Expatriate footballers in Kazakhstan
Russian Premier League players
FC Tyumen players
FC Khimki players
FC Dinamo Minsk players
FC Vostok players
FC Spartak-2 Moscow players